Orkhon Turkic (also Göktürk) is the language used in the oldest known written Turkic texts. It is the first stage of Old Turkic, preceding Old Uyghur. It is generally used for the language in which the Orkhon and Yenisei inscriptions are written.

Vocabulary 
Most of the vocabulary includes words of Turkic origin in Orkhon Turkic. In addition, a few words used are based on origin languages such as Sogdian and Chinese. Mehmet Ölmez claims that about 20% of the vocabulary in Orkhon Turkic comes from neighboring cultures. 

The borrowed words of the Orkhon Turkic period include Chinese, Sogdian, Mongolian, and Tibetan loanwords, although primarily Chinese. In the period of Old Uyghur Turkic that will come right after, Sogdian loanwords increase exponentially. The main reason for the increase of Sogdian influence is that the Uyghurs accepted the Mani religion. In this context, we can say that Orkhon Turkic has a vocabulary that is less influenced by Sogdian and more heavily influenced by Chinese.

Phonology 
Orkhon Turkic is a Shaz Turkic language, also a d-type Turkic language (e.g; Turkish: ayak, Chuvash: ура (ura) but Old Turkic: 𐰑𐰴 (adaq)) which belongs to the Siberian Turkic branch. Orkhon Turkic sometimes has long vowels.

Dialects 
Turkic people used a common literary language in the 5th-8th centuries, but there were some differences. It is possible to examine the Orkhon Turkic under two Yenisei and the Classical Orkhon Turkic headings. Orkhon Turkic had two main dialects, both written in Orkhon script.

Yenisei Kyrgyz Inscriptions and the Dialect 
The language used in the inscriptions found along the Yenisei river is called the Yenisei Kyrgyz dialect. (See more at Yenisei Inscriptions)

Phonetic Features 
In Yenisei inscriptions, the letters e and i change places from time to time. The same change is seen in b with m, g with k, ş with s, and z with s. It has also been seen once in the letters ı and i.

Morphonological Features 
A completely morphological difference was not detected in the Yenisei Inscriptions. But there are some points:

 In Orkhon inscriptions, the case of direction takes the suffix -a/-e after the possessive suffix, while in the Yenisei inscriptions it sometimes takes the suffixes -qa/-ke/-ğa/-ge when the same is the case.

 In the locative case, the letters l and n sometimes have the suffix -te/-ta but sometimes the suffix -de/-da.

 The past tense begins irregularly, sometimes with a hard consonant and sometimes with a soft consonant.

Orkhon Turkic Inscriptions and the Dialect (Classical) 
The language used in the inscriptions, most of which are found along the Orkhon river is called the Orkhon Turkic language. It contains not only tombstones but also diaries describing state events. For this reason, it is richer in terms of language and the language used expertly. (See more at Orkhon inscriptions)

Other Inscriptions Written in Orkhon Turkic language

Talas Inscriptions 
They are found around the Talas, Issyk-Kul and Kochkor. They were written with the Yenisei variants of the Orkhon alphabet. It is believed that these inscriptions were also written by the Kyrgyzs.

The language of the texts used in the inscriptions is the same as the language used in the Orkhon and Yenisei inscriptions. The suffix -ka after the possessive suffix, which is seen in some of the Yenisei Kyrgyz inscriptions, is not seen in these inscriptions.

References

Talat Tekin, A Grammar of Orkhon Turkic, Uralic and Altaic Series Vol. 69, Indiana University Publications, Mouton and Co. (1968). (review: Gerard Clauson, Bulletin of the School of Oriental and African Studies, University of London, 1969); Routledge Curzon (1997), .

Turkic languages
Extinct languages of Asia
Göktürks
Agglutinative languages